Church of St. Panteleimon can refer to:

 Church of St. Panteleimon (Gorno Nerezi), North Macedonia
 Church of Saints Clement and Panteleimon, Ohrid, North Macedonia
 Church of Saint Panteleimon (Thessaloniki), Greece
 Church of Saint Panteleimon of Acharnai, Athens, Greece
 Church of St. Panteleimon (Veles) in Veles, North Macedonia

See also
 Panteley (disambiguation) for people or places named Panteley or Panteleimon